Andrej Hesek (born 12 June 1981 in Bratislava) is a Slovak former football striker who currently plays for APOP Kinyras Peyias.

References

External links
 
 

1981 births
Living people
Slovak footballers
Slovakia international footballers
Slovak expatriate footballers
ŠK Slovan Bratislava players
OFK 1948 Veľký Lapáš players
FK Dukla Banská Bystrica players
FC Nitra players
FK Teplice players
FK Jablonec players
FK Senica players
MFK Zemplín Michalovce players
APOP Kinyras FC players
Expatriate footballers in the Czech Republic
Expatriate footballers in Cyprus
Slovak Super Liga players
Czech First League players
Cypriot Second Division players
Footballers from Bratislava
Association football forwards